Away may refer to:

Film and television
Away (2016 film), a 2016 British film
Away (2019 film), a 2019 animated silent film
Away (TV series), a 2020 science fiction drama on Netflix

Literature
Away (play), a 1986 play by Michael Gow
Away, a 2007 novel by Amy Bloom
Away, a 1980 collection of poems by Andrew Salkey

Music
Away (album), a 2016 album by Okkervil River
Away, a 2021 album by Dntel
"Away" (Ayra Starr song)
"Away" (Enrique Iglesias song)
"Away" (Fatin Shidqia song)
"Away", a song by Before the Dawn from The Ghost
"Away", a song by Breaking Benjamin from We Are Not Alone
"Away", a song by the Cranberries from No Need to Argue
"Away", a song by the Feelies from Only Life
"Away", a song by G.E.M. from Heartbeat
"Away", a song by Neurosis from Times of Grace
"Away", a song by Nightwish from Over the Hills and Far Away
"Away", a song by Toadies from Rubberneck
"Away", a song by Devin Townsend from Accelerated Evolution
"Away!", a song by Wuthering Heights from Salt

Other uses
Away (company), a luggage retailer
Away (sports), games played "away" from a team's home venue
Away, Rajasthan, a village in India
Michel Langevin (born 1963), known as Away, drummer for Voivod

See also
 "Away Away Away", a song by the Hollies from Butterfly
 So Far Away (disambiguation)